The 1991 Junior World Sports Acrobatics Championships was the second edition of the acrobatic gymnastics competition, then named sports acrobatics, and took place in Beijing, China, from September 26 to September 28, 1991. The competition was organized by the International Federation of Sports Acrobatics (IFSA).

Medal summary

Results

References

Junior World Acrobatic Gymnastics Championships
Junior World Acrobatic Gymnastics Championships
Junior World Gymnastics Championships
International gymnastics competitions hosted by China
Sports competitions in Beijing